The Hulk is a superhero that appears in comic books published by Marvel Comics.

Hulk may also refer to:


People
 Zach Banner (born 1993), American National Football League player nicknamed "the Hulk"
 Nico Hülkenberg, German Formula One race car driver nicknamed "the Hulk"
 Antonio Salazar (footballer) (born 1989), Mexican footballer nicknamed "Hulk"
 Carlos Gabriel (born 1999), Brazilian football left-back also known as "Hulk"
 Hulk (footballer) (born 1986), Brazilian football winger Givanildo Vieira de Souza
 Johannes Frederik Hulk (1829–1911), Dutch painter, draftsman and photographer
 Abraham Hulk Senior (1813-1897), Dutch artist
 Hulk Hogan (born 1953), American professional wrestler

Arts and entertainment
 Hulk (film), a 2003 film by Ang Lee
 Hulk (video game), a video game based on the 2003 film
 Hulk (Marvel Cinematic Universe character)
 Hulk Bryman, a fictional baseball player in the 2006 rhythm video game Elite Beat Agents

Ships
 Hulk (ship type), a ship that is afloat but incapable of sailing
 Hulk (medieval ship type), an early European coastal craft type

See also
 
 The Incredible Hulk (disambiguation)
 She-Hulk (disambiguation)

Lists of people by nickname